Marshtown is an unincorporated community in Fulton County, Indiana, in the United States. It is also known as Bluegrass or Blue Grass.

History
The post office Marshtown once contained was called Blue Grass. The Blue Grass post office operated from 1851 until 1906.

References

Unincorporated communities in Fulton County, Indiana
Unincorporated communities in Indiana